Gjert Arne Ingebrigtsen (born 1966) is a Norwegian sports coach. He was awarded the title Norwegian Sports Coach of the Year for 2018.

Career
Ingebrigtsen was born in Båtsfjord and resides in Sandnes. He is married to Tone Eva Tønnessen; the couple has seven children, including middle-distance runners Henrik, Filip and Jakob.

Ingebrigtsen coached three sons until 2022; those sons all had significant achievements in 2018. At the 2018 European Athletics Championships, Jakob won gold medals in both 1500 m and 5000 m, while Henrik won a silver medal in 5,000 m and placed fourth in 1500 m. Filip won gold medal at the 2018 European Cross Country Championships. Ingebrigtsen was awarded the title Norwegian Sports Coach of the Year for 2018, awarded at Idrettsgallaen in January 2019.

Henrik, Filip and Jakob have all competed at the Summer Olympics. Henrik placed fifth in 1500 metres at the 2012 Summer Olympics in London, and reached the semifinal in 1500 metres at the 2016 Summer Olympics. Both Filip and Jakob competed in 1500 metres at the 2020 Summer Olympics in Tokyo, where Jakob won the gold medal and set Olympic record with time 3:28.32.

The Ingebrigtsen family has been featured in the television series Team Ingebrigtsen.

References

1966 births
Living people
People from Båtsfjord
People from Sandnes
Norwegian athletics coaches
Norwegian Olympic coaches
Ingebrigtsen family
Sportspeople from Rogaland